is a Japanese manga artist. His most notable work was as the illustrator for Nisio Isin's manga series Medaka Box, which ran in Weekly Shōnen Jump from 2009 to 2013. Another one of his works Luger Code 1951 was adapted into a net anime by Studio Deen in 2016.

Works
  – Akamaru Jump, 2003
Angel Agent – Jump the Revolution!, 2005
  – Weekly Shōnen Jump, 2006–07, one-shot and series
  – Akamaru Jump, 2008
  – Weekly Shōnen Jump, 2009–13, one-shot and 22 volume series, with Nisio Isin – Illustrator
 Good Loser Kumagawa – Weekly Shōnen Jump, 2011, one-shot, with Isio Nisin – spin-off of Medaka Box
  – Jump Next!, 2013
  – Weekly Shonen Jump, 2014, one shot, with Nisio Isin

References 

Japanese illustrators
Living people
1977 births